The Wetherby News is a local weekly tabloid newspaper published on a Thursday and based in Wetherby, West Yorkshire, England.

The newspaper was founded in 1859 with its offices on the High Street next to the Angel Inn.

The paper's news editor is Janet Harrison, with Jean MacQuarrie as group editor of the parent Ackrill Media Group. Amy Craven is sports editor. The paper is part of the Johnston Press stable.

The paper's news and sport patch includes Wetherby, Tadcaster, Boston Spa and Sherburn in Elmet, covering local events from rural North Yorkshire to parts of urban north Leeds such as Slaid Hill, Alwoodley and Whinmoor.  The newspaper has its offices on Westgate in Wetherby.

The Wetherby News carries a large property supplement, covering Wetherby as well as the surrounding districts. It also has an in-depth weekend supplement, a full weekly guide to what's on in West and North Yorkshire, entertainment news, live music and cinema guides and full classified listings. 

The Wetherby News has a partnership with Tempo FM with whom it provides a weekly news review every Friday morning.

In 2012 the Wetherby News became a tabloid and moved its publications from a Friday to a Thursday.

References 

Wetherby
Wetherby
Wetherby
Newspapers established in 1859
1859 establishments in England
Newspapers published by Johnston Press